Markab may refer to:

Stars 
 Alpha Pegasi
 Tau Pegasi
 k Puppis, erroneously
 Kappa Velorum

Other uses 
 Markab (horse), a Thoroughbred racehorse
 Margat, a castle in Syria
 Markab, a fictional civilization in Babylon 5

See also
Marcab Confederacy, a galactic civilization according to Scientology
Markeb (disambiguation)